Abbas Yazdani (also Romanized as ʿAbbās Yazdānī) is a village in Jarqavieh Sofla Rural District, Jarqavieh Sofla District, Isfahan County, Isfahan Province, Iran. Although the 2006  national census mentioned its existence, its population was not reported.

References 

Populated places in Isfahan County